The New York Red Bulls are an American professional soccer club based in the New York metropolitan area. The Red Bulls compete in Major League Soccer (MLS) as a member of the Eastern Conference. The club was established in October 1994 and began play in the league's inaugural season in 1996 as the New York/New Jersey MetroStars. In 2006, the team was sold to Red Bull GmbH and re-branded as part of the company's global network of soccer clubs, hence its current name.

The Red Bulls have played their home matches at Red Bull Arena in Harrison, New Jersey since 2010, having previously played at Giants Stadium. The club is one of two teams in MLS based in the New York metropolitan region along with New York City FC, which entered the league in 2015. The two teams compete against each other in the Hudson River Derby.

The Red Bulls have reached the MLS Cup final once in 2008 where they were defeated by the Columbus Crew. The club has won three regular season Supporters' Shield titles in 2013, 2015 and 2018, has also twice reached the final of the U.S. Open Cup in 2003 and 2017, losing on both occasions.

History

MetroStars era
The club's original name was Empire Soccer Club, which gave birth to the name of the team's largest supporters' group, Empire Supporters Club. The team's original owners were John Kluge and Stuart Subotnick.  The name MetroStars was chosen in reference to Metromedia, the media company founded by Kluge, after Nike's original suggestion "MetroFlash" was rejected.  The owners also considered but rejected buying the rights to the name "Cosmos".

Tab Ramos, the first player to sign with MLS, became the first MetroStars player, and was soon joined by 1994 FIFA World Cup teammate Tony Meola and A.C. Milan star midfielder Roberto Donadoni. 1990 World Cup player Peter Vermes was named the first team captain, but it was the previously unknown Venezuelan Giovanni Savarese who became the Metros' first breakthrough star. The team's first coach was Eddie Firmani of New York Cosmos fame.

In 1996, the MetroStars made news when they selected players named Juninho and Túlio in the 1996 MLS Supplemental Draft. This report set off an immediately positive reaction which was quickly crushed after the MetroStars revealed that they had not actually drafted well-known Brazilian players Juninho Paulista and Túlio Costa, as people had assumed. The MetroStars waived both draftees on March 25, 1996. While the identity of "Juninho" was later discovered, the true name and club history of "Tulio" remains unknown. This bizarre episode has entered MetroStars folk lore.

When the league began play in 1996, it was expected that the MetroStars would quickly become the league's dominant team. This expectation never materialized. Despite famous players and high-profile coach, the team never seemed to click together. The team's first home game against the New England Revolution proved to be a harbinger of things to come. Former Juventus defender Nicola Caricola inadvertently flipped a cross into his own net in the dying minutes to hand New England a 1–0 win in front of 46,000 fans.

The resulting play would later be dubbed the "Curse of Caricola" by fans to explain the team's inability to come through with a domestic trophy in their history. Firmani left after eight games (3–5) and was replaced by former Portugal coach Carlos Queiróz, who did no better than even (12–12) the rest of the season. The team made it into the playoffs, only to lose to eventual champions D.C. United.

Starting in 1998, the team stopped referring to itself as New York/New Jersey, but it took a few years for the media and fans to catch up. The team went by just MetroStars, with no city, state or regional geographic name attached to it, a rarity in American sports.

The MetroStars bottomed out in 1999 with a record of 7–25 under former U.S. national team coach Bora Milutinović, the worst record in MLS history. Hoping to light a spark under the floundering club in 2000, the MetroStars dropped a bombshell by acquiring German international player Lothar Matthäus from Bayern Munich. Matthäus played in only 16 MLS games during the season and his tenure in the U.S. is considered a disappointment. The team did, however, leap from dead last to the conference title.

On August 26, 2000, the MetroStars' Clint Mathis set an MLS record by scoring five goals in a game against the Dallas Burn.

In 2003 the club hired new manager Bob Bradley, a New Jersey native known for winning multiple titles as an assistant with D.C. United and head coach with the Chicago Fire. Bradley led the team to the U.S. Open Cup final and a playoff berth in his first season. In 2004 the MetroStars became the first MLS team to win a trophy outside of North American soil with a victory in the La Manga Cup. The MetroStars defeated Ukraine's Dynamo Kyiv 3–2 in the semi-finals before edging Norway's Viking FK 1–0 in the final.

Bradley was fired during the 2005 season and assistant Mo Johnston was named interim head coach, guiding the team to seven points in its last three games; the MetroStars made it to the playoffs, but yet another season ended in disappointment when they were knocked out of the playoffs with a 3–2 loss to the New England Revolution.

Red Bull takeover (2006–2009) 

On March 9, 2006, it was announced that Austrian energy drink conglomerate Red Bull GmbH had purchased the club, and as part of their sponsorship, they would also completely re-brand the franchise, changing the name, colors, and logo, a move which drew mixed reactions. The club name was changed to "Red Bull New York", with the team now referred to as the "New York Red Bulls" by the league and the media.

Red Bull had originally approached MLS about creating an expansion club in New York City proper, but concerns over the cost of buying out the MetroStars' territorial rights to the region, along with the expected difficulty in securing a stadium site in the city, led the company to purchase the MetroStars instead and take over their existing stadium project in Harrison, New Jersey.  The territorial rights to a second New York area franchise reverted to MLS as part of the sale.

During the 2006 season, Red Bull fired Johnston and hired Bruce Arena, a Brooklyn native who had recently left the head coaching role with the United States national team. The team soon after signed national team captain Claudio Reyna as a designated player along with Colombian star Juan Pablo Angel, while teenage striker Jozy Altidore emerged as one of the league's brightest young talents. That summer the Red Bulls defeated German club Bayern Munich 4–2 in a friendly at Giants Stadium and lost a friendly against FC Barcelona 4–1 in front of a sold-out crowd in East Rutherford. On August 18, 2007, the Red Bulls hosted the Los Angeles Galaxy for the league debut of David Beckham, drawing 66,238 fans. Arena guided the Red Bulls to the 2007 MLS playoffs, but they were eliminated in the first round by the New England Revolution. Two days later, on November 5, 2007, Arena resigned as coach of the Red Bulls. Red Bull then acquired Colombian coach Juan Carlos Osorio from Chicago Fire during the off-season.

In 2008, Altidore was sold to Spanish club Villarreal CF for a U.S. record transfer fee while Reyna retired due to chronic injuries in July. Over 47,000 tickets were sold to July 19 game versus the Los Angeles Galaxy, which was the team's and league's season record attendance. The game ended in a 2–2 draw with goals from Dave van den Bergh and Juan Pablo Ángel.
The Red Bulls again played Spanish powerhouse FC Barcelona in a friendly match on August 6 before about 40,000 fans. They lost 6–2, with their goals scored by Jorge Rojas and Seth Stammler.  On August 11, the Red Bulls defeated rival D.C. United in a 4–1 win, keeping the Red Bulls in the tight Eastern Conference playoff race, though United did maintain the Atlantic Cup for another year. Though they were the last team to qualify for the playoffs in the 2008 season, the Red Bulls made an impressive run, defeating two-time defending champions Houston Dynamo 4–1 on aggregate. The next week, they played Real Salt Lake in the Western Conference final at Rio Tinto Stadium in Utah. Dave van den Bergh put the Red Bulls ahead. This win put the Red Bulls into the 2008 MLS Cup final against MLS Supporters' Shield winners, the Columbus Crew. The Red Bulls lost 3–1, with their lone goal coming from John Wolyniec.

The New York Red Bulls started the 2009 season against Seattle Sounders FC at Qwest Field in Seattle. The hosts, playing in their first MLS match, won 3–0. As MLS Cup runners-up, the team also qualified for the 2009–10 CONCACAF Champions League. The New York Red Bulls took part in the tournament's second edition, starting in the qualifying round against Trinidad and Tobago side W Connection. The club drew 2–2 away to W Connection but lost 2–1 at home and were eliminated without reaching the group stage.

The club's 2009 season was highly disappointing. They went on a 16-game winless streak which lasted from May 8 to August 23. They also endured a 23-game winless streak on the road which dated back to May 10, 2008, in a 2–1 win over the Los Angeles Galaxy, in which they finish the season at 0–17–3 on the road. After the preliminary exit from the Champions League, many fans were disappointed by Osorio's rigid tactical style, while others wanted then-Sporting Director Jeff Agoos fired. On August 21, 2009, Osorio resigned from his position. Assistant Richie Williams again took over as the club's interim coach. In his second stint as interim coach, Williams led the Red Bulls to a 3–2–3 record despite finishing with a league-worst record of 5–6–19 (21 points).

The Backe era and new stadium (2010–2012) 

The 2010 season brought about a new stadium, a new sporting director and coaching staff, and a new group of players to the Red Bulls, who hoped to dramatically improve from their disappointing 2009 season. On January 7, 2010, the Red Bulls confirmed the hiring of veteran Swedish manager Hans Backe as head coach. Not long after Backe was confirmed as coach, he started to release many players signed by Osorio including Jorge Rojas, Danny Cepero, Carlos Johnson, and Walter García, while midfielder Matthew Mbuta's contract was not picked up for the 2010 season. Under the direction of Backe and newly hired Norwegian sporting director Erik Solér, the club began a new approach of signing veteran European players (mainly from Scandinavia and Britain) instead of the South American and Central American players that are usually sought after in MLS. With Backe as head coach, the Red Bulls went undefeated in the 2010 preseason, including the first ever match at Red Bull Arena against Santos FC of Brazil, which the Red Bulls won 3–1. In this preseason game, newly signed Estonian international midfielder Joel Lindpere became the first player to score a goal in Red Bull Arena. The Red Bulls carried this form into the first MLS match at Red Bull Arena against the Chicago Fire by winning 1–0 with the lone goal coming from Joel Lindpere. A week later, the Red Bulls defeated the Seattle Sounders 1–0 at Qwest Field in Seattle, breaking a 27-game road winless streak.

The club signed legendary French forward Thierry Henry as a designated player in July 2010. A month later on August 2, the Red Bulls signed their third designated player, Mexican international defender Rafael Márquez. The signing of Márquez established the Red Bulls as the first MLS team to have three designated players. With these new additions, the Red Bulls improved further and clinched first place in the Eastern Conference for the first time since 2000. New York also set an MLS record for best one-season improvement, finishing with 51 points after having just 21 points the previous year. Despite the impressive turnaround, the season again ended in disappointment for the Red Bulls. The Eastern Conference semi-finals saw the Red Bulls fall to the San Jose Earthquakes.  Joel Lindpere was named the season's Most Valuable Player.

Prior to the 2011 season Backe brought in a number of new European signings including Luke Rodgers, Jan Gunnar Solli, and Teemu Tainio, and announced that Thierry Henry would be the captain for the 2011 season. However the season also began with a cloud of controversy after the club fired longtime assistant coaches Richie Williams and Des McAleenan for undisclosed contract violations during training camp.

The Red Bulls opened the 2011 season sluggishly, with Henry's quiet goalscoring form and issues with set piece defending leading to a slew of winless streaks. In July the Red Bulls exited the U.S. Open Cup with a 4–0 quarterfinal loss to the Chicago Fire, drawing much negative attention from supporters due to Backe's decision to not attend the match in person and instead send a reserve squad to Chicago with assistant coach Mike Petke. Backe earned additional criticism during this period when he stated he had not been aware that he would lose so many players to summer international tournaments including the CONCACAF Gold Cup. In July the Red Bulls signed veteran German goalkeeper Frank Rost to a designated player contract to address the Red Bulls' goalkeeping woes after the struggles of Bouna Coundoul and Greg Sutton. The Red Bulls defeated Paris St. Germain on the way to winning the 2011 Emirates Cup friendly tournament hosted by Arsenal FC in London. The Red Bulls would eventually rally to qualify for the MLS Cup playoffs but lost on aggregate in the quarterfinals to eventual champions Los Angeles Galaxy to end the 2011 season.

Backe was retained for the 2012 season and Red Bull signed Australian World Cup and Premier League veteran Tim Cahill as a designated player in July. They qualified for the MLS Cup playoffs with a third-place finish in the Eastern Conference. However, after a 1–1 draw in the first leg in D.C., and having the second leg postponed twice due to Hurricane Sandy and a major snowstorm, the Red Bulls would go on to lose their home leg 1–0 to D.C. United and were eliminated from the Eastern Conference semi-finals for the second straight year. A few hours after the loss it was announced that Hans Backe's contract with the Red Bulls would not be renewed and he had been relieved of his duties. Mike Petke, the Red Bulls' most capped player and Backe's assistant, was placed in charge of soccer operations in the interim until a replacement for could be found.

The Petke era and first trophy (2013–2014) 

In the 2012–2013 off-season, a large structural overhaul occurred within the organization. In addition to Backe they parted ways with sporting director Erik Soler and brought in two people to split his former responsibilities; Andy Roxburgh was named sporting director and given responsibility for all technical and soccer operations, while Jerome de Bontin was named general manager, with an emphasis placed on corporate operations.
With these changes at the top levels in place, several key players including designated player Rafael Márquez, Joel Lindpere, Kenny Cooper and Wilman Conde were either sold or traded. In an effort to revitalize the team, New York brought in players with a history of success, such as Brazilian World Cup veteran Juninho Pernambucano and former MLS Cup Champions such as Fabián Espíndola, Jámison Olave, and Kosuke Kimura.

On January 24, it was announced that Mike Petke remain in place as the permanent head coach, removing his interim status. This marked the first time in club history the team would be coached by a former MetroStars/Red Bulls player. Petke's first season in charge began with a 3–3 draw on March 3, 2013, away to the Portland Timbers.
Petke showed a knack for making adjustments when he countered a slow 0–2–2 start by switching the formation from a 4–2–3–1 formation to a 4–4–2 – placing more emphasis on playing a strong defensive game, and playing up through the midfield. The rookie manager sought to turn the club around, and gain his first win by the end of the month. On March 30, 2013, he did just that against the Philadelphia Union, by the score of 2–1.

Petke sought to instill a more aggressive mindset into the team to make up for the relative lack of time the team had spent playing together. Some have called the team "mentally weak" due to how the team has fluctuated between scrappy play and impressive displays of form and moments of "playing down to" inferior teams. However, after putting on impressive displays, the team went on a two-month undefeated streak and won the 2013 Supporters' Shield as the team with the best regular-season record.
This win also secured the top seed and home-field advantage in the MLS Cup post-season tournament.

In the 2014 season, the Red Bulls qualified for the 2014 MLS playoffs, and eliminated Sporting Kansas City in the knockout round of the playoffs, advancing to face D.C. United. The Red Bulls made it to the Eastern Conference final to face the New England Revolution, but were defeated. The club lost two of their designated players when it announced that Thierry Henry would retire following the season, while Tim Cahill was released during the offseason.

Jesse Marsch, Ali Curtis and "Energy Drink Soccer" (2015–2018) 

On December 23, 2014, former MLS player and league office executive Ali Curtis replaced the retiring Andy Roxburgh as Sporting Director. In a surprise announcement two weeks later on January 7, 2015, Petke was released as head coach and replaced with former Montreal Impact coach Jesse Marsch. Tension between the fans and the front office came to a head at a hectic town hall featuring Curtis, Marsch, goalkeeper Luis Robles and emcee and sportswriter Frank Isola.

The target was to implement, on the pitch, a consequent pressing style implemented in many of then Red Bull footballs sporting director Ralf Rangnick teams, and, in apply this as well when transferring players, and in the academy. Marsch once said the team would play like "an energy drink," which was derided but "Energy Drink Soccer" became a way for the fanbase to describe the way in which they preferred the club play.

In his first season with Red Bulls, Marsch implemented a high-pressure tactical system built around the talents of recently signed players such as Sacha Kljestan, Mike Grella and a returning Wright-Phillips, while academy product Matt Miazga emerged as a key defender, eventually being signed by English club Chelsea following the season. The Red Bulls won their second Supporter's Shield, qualifying for the 2015 MLS playoffs and reaching the Eastern Conference Final where they were ultimately defeated by the Columbus Crew.

On May 21, 2016, the team tied an MLS record for largest victory margin, winning 7–0 at New York City FC. Marsch signed a multi-year extension in June 2016. At the end of July, Wright-Phillips became the club's all-time leading goal scorer, passing Henry on his way to a total he'd eventually double in New York. On September 27, 2016, the Red Bulls qualified for their first ever CONCACAF Champions League quarterfinal series with a 0–0 draw at Guatemalan club Antigua GFC.

Prior to the 2017 season Ali Curtis left the club and was replaced by Denis Hamlett, who then sold captain and longest-tenured player Dax McCarty to the Chicago Fire for allocation money. Though highlighted by the emergence of homegrown talent Tyler Adams, the team went on to have a mixed campaign, with a sixth-place conference finish and quarterfinal playoff exit to Toronto FC while also reaching the final of the US Open Cup for the second time in their history, before losing a 2–1 result to Sporting Kansas City.

New York made their best showing to date in continental competition the next year in the 2018 CONCACAF Champions League. In the quarterfinal against Club Tijuana, they became the first MLS club to win by multiple goals on Mexican soil, with a 2–0 defeat of Tijuana in the quarterfinals on a brace from Wright-Phillips and 13 saves by Robles.

In the return leg, new designated player and record signing Kaku scored on his debut off the bench as the Red Bulls won 3-1 for a 5-1 victory in the tie in Harrison.

In the semifinals, New York, despite outshooting Mexican giants Chivas 20-1 in the home second leg, were beaten by a goal in the first leg that resigned the Red Bulls to a 1-0 loss in the tie.

Days before the third Hudson River Derby of the 2018 MLS season, it was announced that Jesse Marsch would leave his role as coach effective immediately, with assistant coach Chris Armas taking over the role, joining Ralf Rangnick in German Bundesliga RB Leipzig. Marsch, left the club, as most successful in franchise history, with one Supporters' Shield, topping the Eastern Conference twice, and runners up in the US Open Cup. He also left with most wins in the history of the franchise.

The third Supporters Shield and the Armas era (2018–2020)

Assistant coach Chris Armas replaced Jesse Marsch, who left the franchise after three and a half seasons. The Red Bulls won their third Supporters' Shield in the 2018 season after winning their last five games to overtake Atlanta United in a tight race on the season's final day, setting what was then a record for points in a season and securing qualification for the 2019 CONCACAF Champions League. Atlanta got revenge on New York in the Eastern Conference Finals, which they won 3-1 over two legs after a controversial offside call that denied Wright-Phillips an away goal in the first leg.

Wright-Phillips became the fastest player to 100 MLS goals in the history of the league after scoring against DC United on July 25, 2018, all 100 scored with New York. The Englishman finished the season with 20 goals in the league, becoming the first player in MLS history to achieve the feat three times.

Tyler Adams was sold to RB Leipzig in January 2019 for a sum of $3,000,000 and 33% of any future transfer earnings.

New York stumbled through the 2019 season, with Wright-Phillips spending most of it injured, In his place, 20 other different Red Bulls registered at least a goal, a club record. After easing past Atlético Pantoja, their run in the 2019 CONCACAF Champions League was abruptly ended by Santos Laguna. New York finished 6th in the East and despite holding a 3–1 lead at halftime, fell in the first round of the 2019 MLS Cup Playoffs to Philadelphia Union in extra time 4–3.

Luis Robles and Bradley Wright-Phillips, the player who'd played the most times for the club in their history and the player who'd scored the most goals in their history, departed in the offseason.

Sean Davis was named the club's first homegrown captain ahead of the 2020 season, becoming the fifth native of New Jersey to wear the armband.

Armas, having had a rough start to the COVID-19-impacted 2020 campaign (including a crashing out at the group stage of the MLS is Back Tournament) was formally released from his contract, along with assistant CJ Brown on September 4, 2020, via statement released from Kevin Thelwell, RBNY's Head of Sport who had come over in early 2020 from Wolverhampton Wanderers. Bradley Carnell was named as interim manager the day after.

Gerhard Struber era (2020–present)

Kevin Thelwell hired former Barnsley F.C. manager (and former Red Bull Salzburg player and youth coach) Gerhard Struber as the club's new manager on October 6, 2020. Due to delays driven largely by the COVID-19 pandemic, Struber was unable to make his debut until the Red Bulls, under Carnell's direction, made the 2020 MLS Cup Playoffs. He oversaw a 3–2 away loss to Columbus.

The second half of the 2020 season was notable for the emergence of teenage midfielder Caden Clark, who scored on his debut, second appearance and postseason debut. Clark was sold to RB Leipzig with the move scheduled coming after the 2021 season.

Thelwell and Struber largely rebuilt the roster for the 2021 MLS season, signing 12 new players from a mix of European and South American clubs, as well as an academy product, Bento Estrela, who became the club's youngest-ever signing the day before his 15th birthday. New York also used two loan players from Red Bull Salzburg and signed former Celtic F.C. forward Patryk Klimala as a designated player.

New York struggled for a good portion of the 2021 season with injuries including a ruptured achilles from US international Aaron Long, but put together a 7-1-4 finish to the season to qualify for their 12th consecutive playoffs. The Red Bulls were defeated in the opening round by the Philadelphia Union, 1-0 on a goal in the 123rd minute.

In the offseason, former Salzburg loanee Carlos Miguel Coronel, considered by most to be the team's best player in 2021, was brought back on a permanent contract. The club also bought Lewis Morgan from Inter Miami CF for $1.2 million in targeted allocation money. Davis departed on a free agent contract to Nashville SC.

On the day before the beginning of the 2022 season, Thelwell departed to take over as director of football at Everton. His final transfer window saw Brazilian Luquinhas brought in from Legia Warsaw and Englishman Ashley Fletcher on loan from Watford FC. Clark and defender Tom Edwards also returned on loan deals.

With Long returning from injury and made captain following Davis' departure, New York began the 2022 season tying an MLS record set by the 1998 Los Angeles Galaxy, winning their first five league games on the road. In addition, Red Bulls went six matches undefeated away in the league and eight in all competitions to start 2022. Conversely, the club was winless in their first six home matches in 2022, before an Open Cup victory over Charlotte FC on May 25. 

New York reached the semifinals of the Open Cup in 2022, defeating Hartford Athletic, DC and New York City en route before crashing out with a 5-1 loss to Orlando City. 

Former VFB Stuttgart, Schalke 04, and Red Bull Global director Jochen Schneider replaced Thelwell as Head of Sport on June 11. His first major hire was to bring over Sebastian Hausl from Salzburg as the club's Head of Scouting.

New York qualified for the MLS Cup Playoffs for a 13th-consecutive season, equalling a league record set by Seattle and, with Seattle missing the playoffs in 2022, giving the Red Bulls the active league record. The New York Red Bulls lost, 1-2, against FC Cincinnati in the first round of the playoffs.

New York followed with another active offseason, signing ex-Philadelphia Union striker Corey Burke in December 2022. They also announced the homegrown signings of defenders Curtis Ofori, Peter Stroud and Jayden Reid. The club also confirmed 2022 loan signing Elias Manoel on a permanent transfer. 

The Red Bulls spent a reported $5.3 million to sign forward Dante Vanzeir from Belgian side Royale Union Saint-Gilloise as a designated player. The fee could potentially rise with add-ons to break the club record spend. To make room, the club offloaded Klimala to Hapoel Be'er Sheva F.C..

Captain Aaron Long's departure via free agency was announced on January 3, 2023.

Colors and badge

During the team's first seasons, the MetroStars had solid black or solid white jerseys, before switching to a home jerseys featuring red and black vertical stripes (similar to those worn by A.C. Milan). Since the Red Bull takeover, the team has almost invariably worn white shirts with red shorts at home while using a combination of navy blue and yellow for road kits, each with a prominent Red Bull logo across the chest. Prior to the 2018 season, the club unveiled a new entirely red shirt, replacing the traditional blue-yellow secondary kit.

Stadium

The team is headquartered and plays their home matches at Red Bull Arena in Harrison, New Jersey, which opened for the 2010 MLS season. The stadium has a seating capacity of 25,189. On March 20, 2010, the Red Bull team played an exhibition game against Santos FC in a 3–1 inaugural win. The first MLS league game took place in the new venue on March 27, 2010, with a 1–0 win over the Chicago Fire, the lone goal coming from Estonian international Joel Lindpere.

The club in 2019 and 2022 used MSU Soccer Park, home of the reserve team, for US Open Cup matches when Red Bull Arena was unavailable. 

Previously the team played at Giants Stadium, where they had played their home matches from 1996 until the end of the 2009 season. The stadium was located in East Rutherford, New Jersey.

Training facility

The Red Bulls Training Facility is located in Hanover Township, New Jersey and opened in June 2013. The $6 million facility covers about 15 acres of the 73 acre property and includes four fields, three grass and one turf, each the size of the one at Red Bull Arena. The middle field, which has a grass surface, is heated, while one turf field has lights.

The complex opened with four buildings, with the main one housing separate locker rooms for the senior team, academy teams and coaching staff, film analysis room, offices, a therapy room, a gym, a fitness/wellness area, a hot/cold tub room and a players' lounge, which includes a cafeteria that serves breakfast and lunch. In April 2015, the team opened a new  training building, which includes two team locker rooms, a multipurpose weight and cardio area, a treatment room, exam room, coach and staff lockers, lavatories for both men and women and other miscellaneous areas. In 2017, the team opened a  extension of the 2015 training building for the academy team and the third grass field.

In 2021, the club announced plans to build a new, privately funded training facility in nearby Morris Township. The facility is slated to open in 2024, which would coincide with the 30th anniversary of the club's founding and be usable in time for the 2026 World Cup.

In the past, the Red Bulls led a nomadic existence, making use of several other training grounds before finishing construction of the Hanover facility:
 Kean University East Campus (1996–2002)
 Saint Benedict's Preparatory School (2002)
 Giants Stadium (2003–2007)
 Montclair State University (2007–2013)

Club culture

Supporters
A variety of supporters clubs and groups have grown around the team since its inaugural year. The first of these was formed in 1995, prior to the inception of the team itself, as the Empire Supporters Club. 2005 saw the creation of the New Jersey-based Garden State Supporters, now the Garden State Ultras (GSU). The 2010 season's influx of personnel with a Scandinavian background led to the creation of the Viking Army Supporters Club. In 2021, the third supporters group named Torcida 96 was formed.

The Red Bulls have designated some sections of Red Bull Arena as supporter specific. These included sections 101 for the Empire Supporters Club, 102 for the Viking Army, and 133 for Torcida 96. Sections 133, 101, and 102 are collectively known as the "South Ward".

The Red Bulls had 11,000 season ticket holders for the 2016 MLS Season.

Rivalries
The Red Bulls' oldest rival is D.C. United, against whom they compete for the Atlantic Cup. The New England Revolution and the Philadelphia Union are also rivals of the Red Bulls. The Red Bulls had not defeated the Revolution at the latter's home venue Gillette Stadium for 12 years, until a 2–0 win on June 8, 2014, intensifying the rivalry. These rivalries arise out of geographic proximity and as a reflection of longstanding rivalries between New York-area teams and other teams in Washington, D.C., Boston, and Philadelphia.

In 2015 the Hudson River Derby was born when the Red Bulls faced off against another team from the New York metropolitan area in MLS league play for the first time, when New York City FC entered MLS. Although initially regarded as a manufactured rivalry with little of the traditional banter apparent between long-time local rivals, the first meetings between the teams displayed an increasing level of animosity between the two sides. The Red Bulls won the first ever encounter between the two, a league game on May 10, 2015, at Red Bull Arena. Matches between the two teams were marred by a series of brawls between their supporters.

Although the rivalry with NYCFC was built to be the major one for the Red Bulls, this was not the first time that they played against teams from the New York area, as they played matches in the U.S. Open Cup in both 2011 (against F.C. New York, who have since folded) and 2014 (against the New York Cosmos). The Red Bulls also played against the Cosmos in the 2015 U.S. Open Cup, to a 4–1 victory.

Broadcasting
From its inception as the MetroStars in 1996, Red Bulls matches were televised by MSG and MSG Plus. Joe Tolleson (play-by-play) and Tommy Smyth (analyst) were the original announcers. Derek Rae and JP Dellacamera followed as play-by-play announcers. As of 2012, Steve Cangialosi (play-by-play) and Shep Messing (analyst) are the MSG/MSG Plus announcers.

In 2015, the Red Bulls launched streaming audio game broadcasts from the club's official site, with play-by-play man Matt Harmon and former MetroStar and Red Bull Steve Jolley on the English-language call, and Ernesto Motta in Spanish.  Late in 2015, the club launched a streaming internet station with TuneIn, becoming the first MLS club to provide 24-hour streaming content to its fan base. Fusaro replaced Motta in 2021 but departed ahead of the 2023 season. 

From 2023, every Red Bulls match is available via MLS Season Pass on the Apple TV app. The service features contributions from Cangialosi, Fusaro and Messing, as well as former New York players Sacha Kljestan, Bradley Wright-Phillips and Lloyd Sam.

Players and staff

Roster

Retired numbers 

 99 –  Bradley Wright-Phillips (forward, 2013–2019)

Legends Row 
 Luis Robles

Technical staff

Administrative officials

Player development

New York Red Bulls II
New York Red Bulls II was established in 2015. It is a reserve team that competes in the USL Championship, the second tier of the American soccer pyramid. The team plays its home matches at MSU Soccer Park at Pittser Field in Montclair, New Jersey.

The fully professional team completed its inaugural USL season with a 12–10–6 record in fourth place of the Eastern Conference. The team won its first playoff game against Pittsburgh Riverhounds and advanced as far as the Eastern Conference semifinals in the 2015 USL Playoffs.

A New York Red Bulls team mostly composed of NYRB II players defeated Chelsea F.C. in a 2015 friendly.

In 2016, New York Red Bulls II defeated the Swope Park Rangers 5–1 in the 2016 United Soccer League Final winning their first United Soccer League Championship and became the first Major League Soccer-owned team to win the United Soccer League title.

The team was coached by former Red Bull and New York native John Wolyniec from its founding until the end of the 2021 season. He was replaced by former Seattle Sounders academy director Gary Lewis, with a plan to transition the reserve side into the newly-created MLS Next Pro in 2023.

Academy

The New York Red Bulls Academy is the multi-layered youth system of the New York Red Bulls. It is the first cost-free program in MLS that provides a professional soccer training environment for youth players in the New York metropolitan area. The soccer programs are operated as part of a global approach to player development.

Honors

Club records and statistics

 Most wins in a regular season: 22 (2018) 
 Most points in a regular season: 71 (2018) 
 Most home wins in a regular season: 14 (2018) 
 Most home points in a regular season: 43 (2018) 
 Scored the fastest goal in Major League Soccer history (7 seconds into the game vs the Philadelphia Union on October 18, 2015, at Red Bull Arena)

Player records
MLS regular season only, through March 9, 2019

Career
 Games: 206  Luis Robles
 Minutes: 18,540  Luis Robles
 Goals: 106  Bradley Wright-Phillips
 Assists: 51  Sacha Kljestan
 Shutouts: 63  Luis Robles

Single season
 Goals: 27  Bradley Wright-Phillips, 2014
 Assists: 20  Sacha Kljestan, 2016
 Shutouts: 14  Luis Robles, 2018

Top career goalscorers 

Bold signifies current Red Bulls player

Captains

Year-by-year

This is a partial list of the last five seasons completed by the Red Bulls. For the full season-by-season history, see List of New York Red Bulls seasons.

 1. Avg. attendance include statistics from league matches only.
 2. Top goalscorer(s) includes all goals scored in League, MLS Cup Playoffs, U.S. Open Cup, MLS is Back Tournament, CONCACAF Champions League, FIFA Club World Cup, and other competitive continental matches.

International tournaments

Competitive
 2001 Copa Merconorte
Group stage v.  Deportivo Italchacao: 2–0, 1–2
Group stage v.  Millonarios: 0–1,1–2
Group stage v.  Guadalajara: 2–0, 2–0
 2009–10 CONCACAF Champions League
Preliminary Round v.  W Connection: 2–2, 1–2
 2014–15 CONCACAF Champions League
Group stage v.  FAS: 2–0, 0–0
Group stage v.  Montreal Impact: 1–1, 0–1
 2016–17 CONCACAF Champions League
Group stage v.  Alianza: 1–0, 1–1
Group stage v.  Antigua: 3–0, 0–0
Quarter-finals v.  Vancouver Whitecaps FC: 1–1, 0–2
 2018 CONCACAF Champions League
Round of 16 v.  Olimpia: 1–1, 0–2 (3–1 agg) 
Quarter-finals v.  Tijuana: 2–0, 3–1 (5–1 agg)
Semi-finals v.  Guadalajara: 0–1, 0–0 (0–1 agg)
 2019 CONCACAF Champions League
Round of 16 v.  Atlético Pantoja: 2–0, 3–0 (5–0 agg)
Quarterfinals v.  Santos Laguna: 0–2, 2–4 (2–6 agg)

Friendly
 2004 La Manga Cup
Group stage v.  Viking: 0–1
Group stage v.  Bodø/Glimt: 3–1
Semi-finals v.  Dynamo Kyiv: 3–2
Final v.  Viking: 1–0
 2010 Barclays New York Challenge
Group stage v.  Tottenham Hotspur: 1–2
Group stage v.  Manchester City: 2–1
 2011 Emirates Cup
Group stage v.  Paris Saint-Germain: 1–0
Group stage v.  Arsenal: 1–1

Average attendance

Historical staff

Head coaches

General managers and sporting directors

Ownership

See also
 Red Bull Bragantino
 EC Red Bull Salzburg
 EHC Red Bull München
 New York Red Bulls U-23
 Soccer in New York City

References

External links

 

 
Association football clubs established in 1994
Red Bull sports teams
Soccer clubs in New Jersey
1994 establishments in New Jersey
Soccer clubs in the New York metropolitan area
Sports in East Rutherford, New Jersey
Harrison, New Jersey
Sports in Hudson County, New Jersey
Major League Soccer teams